The 2021 Doncaster Metropolitan Borough Council election took place on 6 May 2021 as part of the 2021 local elections in the United Kingdom. All 55 councillors were elected from 21 wards which return either two or three councillors each by first-past-the-post voting for a four-year term of office.

The election of the Mayor of Doncaster also took place on the same day.

Wards

Doncaster is divided into 21 wards for electoral purposes with each ward electing either two or three councillors. The number of councillors elected by ward is shown in the table below.

Results overview

Council composition
Following the last election in 2017, the composition of the council was:

After the election, the composition of the council was:

MF - Mexborough First 
I - Independent 
E - Edlington and Warmsworth First

Results by ward
Incumbent councillors are denoted by an asterisk.

Adwick-Le-Street and Carcroft

Armthorpe

Balby South

Bentley

Bessacarr

Conisbrough

Edenthorpe & Kirk Sandall

Edlington & Warmsworth

Finningley

Hatfield

Hexthorpe & Balby North

Mexborough

Norton & Askern

Roman Ridge

Rossington & Bawtry

Sprotbrough

Jonathan Wood was previously a Conservative councillor.

Stainforth & Barnby Dun

Both Ken Keegan and George Derx were previously elected as Labour councillors.

Thorne & Moorends

Tickhill & Wadworth

Town

Wheatley Hills & Intake

By-elections

Wheatley Hills & Intake
A by-election will be held in the Wheatley Hills & Intake after the incumbent Labour Party councillor Daniel Barwell resigned following being arrested for an 'offence relating to the distribution of a controlled drug on a warrant issued at the request of United States authorities'.

References

Doncaster Council elections
Doncaster